Popovjani is a village in the municipality of Kičevo, North Macedonia. It was previously in Oslomej Municipality until that municipality was merged into Kičevo Municipality.

Demographics
As of the 2021 census, Popovjani had 142 residents with the following ethnic composition:
Albanians 135
Persons for whom data are taken from administrative sources 6
Macedonians 1

According to the 2002 census, the village had a total of 399 inhabitants. Ethnic groups in the village include:
Albanians 397
Macedonians 2

References

External links

Villages in Kičevo Municipality
Albanian communities in North Macedonia